{{Infobox officeholder
| name                = K. V. Thomas (Thirutha Thoma)
| image               = KV Thomas.jpg
| birth_date          = 
| birth_place         = Kumbalangi, Kingdom of Cochin, British India(present day Ernakulam, Kerala, India)
| nationality         = Indian
| alma_mater          = Sacred Heart College, Thevara<ref>{{Cite web |url=http://mathrubhuminews.in/ee/ReadMore/11659/sacred-hearts-met-at-delhi-after-many-years/ |title=Mathrubhumi: ReadMore -Sacred Hearts' met at Delhi after many years' |access-date=6 January 2015 |archive-date=27 December 2014 |archive-url=https://web.archive.org/web/20141227014453/http://mathrubhuminews.in/ee/ReadMore/11659/sacred-hearts-met-at-delhi-after-many-years |url-status=dead }}</ref>

| office              = Minister of Consumer Affairs, Food & Public Distribution
| term_start          = 19 January 2011
| term_end            = 26 May 2014
| primeminister       = Manmohan Singh
| predecessor         = Sharad Pawar
| successor           = Ram Vilas Paswan
| office1             = Member of Parliament, Lok Sabha
| constituency1       = Ernakulam
| term_start1         = 2009
| term_end1           = 2019
| predecessor1        = Sebastian Paul
| successor1          = Hibi Eden
| term_start2         = 1984
| term_end2           = 1996
| constituency2       = Ernakulam
| predecessor2        = Xavier Arakkal
| successor2          = Xavier Arakkal
| office3             = Member of Kerala Legislative Assembly
| term_start3         = 2001
| term_end3           = 2009
| constituency3       = Ernakulam
| predecessor3        = Sebastian Paul
| successor3          = Dominic Presentation
| party               = Indian National Congress
| father              = K. D. Varkey
| mother              = Rosa Varkey
| spouse              = Sherly Thomas
| children            = 3
| footnotes           = 
| date                =
| source              =
}}

Kuruppasserry Varkey Thomas (born 10 May 1946), is an Indian politician from Kumbalangi in Ernakulam district, Kerala, India. He  represented  Ernakulam Constituency from 2009 to 2019. He was the Minister of State in the Ministry of Agriculture and Minister of State in the Ministry of Consumer Affairs, Food and Public Distribution, 2nd UPA Government; a member of the Indian Parliament; and was a member of All India Congress Committee from 1984 to 2022. He is now the official representative of the Government of Kerala with Cabinet Rank at New Delhi.

Personal life
K. V. Thomas was born to K. D. Varkey and Rose Varkey on 10 May 1946. He has two elder brothers, Dr. K. V. Peter and K. V. Joseph. He is married to Sherly Thomas. They have a daughter and two sons.

Career

Thomas was a member of the 11th (2001-2006) and 12th (2006-2009) Kerala Legislative Assembly representing the Ernakulam assembly constituency.  While contesting the 2009 Indian general election he was an MLA from Ernakulam .Kerala Legislature - Members He served as the Minister for Excise and Tourism and Minister for Tourism and Fisheries between 2001 and 2004 in Government of Kerala. Thomas was a member of Lok Sabha from 1984 to 1996 and then from 2009 to 2019. During his long political career he held several positions like President, 7th  Ward Congress Committee (1970–75); Convener, Block Youth Congress, Palluruthy (1971–80); General Secretary. Cochin Taluk INTUC (1971–76), Kerala INTUC (1986–91), DCC Ernakulam (1978–86); Treasurer, KPCC (1991–96); President of Ernakulam District Congress (I) Committee; KPCC Working President, Member of KPCC; Member of Kerala State Election Congress (I) Committee; Organising Secretary & General Secretary of INTUC (Kerala); AICC Observer to Tamil Nadu, Karnataka, Andhra Pradesh and Lakshadweep. He is also a member of General Council of INTUC (trade union wing of the Indian National Congress) since 1976. He served as the chairman of PAC (Public Accounts Committee) for three years from 2014 to 2017.

On 10 April 2022, Thomas attended a seminar in Communist Party of India (Marxist)'s 23rd party Congress in Kannur. For this he was officially removed from key party posts. In May 2022, shortly after attending an election campaign of the Left Democratic Front in Kochi, he was expelled from the Congress party for alleged anti-party activities.

Education

Thomas holds a MSc degree in Chemistry and was a Professor of Chemistry for a period of 33 years at Sacred Heart College, Thevara. He served as the Head of the Department (Chemistry) from 1 June 1999 to 31 May 2001.

Other positions that Thomas held include Member of Defence Consultative Committee; Member of Civil Aviation and Tourism Consultative Committee; Court Member of Jawaharlal Nehru University, New Delhi and Pondicherry University; Director Board Member of Marine Products Export Development Authority; Director of Cochin International Airport Limited; President of All Kerala Ration Dealers Association; Working President of Indian Rare Earth Employees Congress; Chairman of Indira Gandhi Co-operative Hospital, Ernakulam (1994–96), Member of Official Language Committee of the Kerala Legislative Assembly (2004–06).

Biography

Thomas is the author of several books. His first book, Ente Kumbalangi'', which is about his native village Kumbalangi, was released on 17 November 2004. Since then he has published five more books.

References

External links

Prof. K V Thomas's Official Election Website
Fifteenth Lok Sabha - Prof. K.V.Thomas's Bio profile page
Prof. K. V. Thomas - A brief biography

Union ministers of state of India
Politicians from Kochi
India MPs 2009–2014
1946 births
Living people
Indian National Congress politicians from Kerala
India MPs 1984–1989
India MPs 1989–1991
India MPs 1991–1996
Lok Sabha members from Kerala
India MPs 2014–2019
Malayali politicians
20th-century Indian chemists
Scientists from Kochi